Agwilines Inc was a passenger and cargo shipping company of New York City. Agwilines is short for Atlantic, Gulf & West Indies Steamship Inc.
AGWI Lines group operated four main lines in the 1910s, 1920s and 1930s:
Ward Line 
Clyde line 
 Mallory Line 
 Porto Rico Line 
 Later the Clyde-Mallory Lines

Agwilines Inc had offices in: New York, Philadelphia, Boston, Chicago, and Washington and was founded in 1908. In 1949, Graham-Newman Corporation (1926–1956), an investment corporation, purchased 70,000 shares of Agwilines Inc to become the controlling interest. Graham-Newman Corporation was founded by Benjamin Graham and Jerome Newm in 1926.

Mallory Line
Mallory Line, also called New York & Texas Steamship Company of New York City was founded in 1866 and closed in 1932. Mallory Line was an early family-owned passenger line, started by Charles Henry Mallory C. H. Mallory (1818–1890), in the coastwise trade. Mallory established C.H. Mallory & Company with his partner Elihu Spicer (1825–1993). Mallory Line served New York, Galveston, Texas, New Orleans, Havana, and Mobile. In 1907 Mallory Line was sold to Charles W. Morse who with the Ward Line started the Consolidated Steamship Lines. In 1908 Consolidated Steamship went bankrupt and was sold to the Atlantic, Gulf and West Indies (AGWI) SS Company. AGWI continues the Mallory Line until 1932. The Metropolitan Steamship Company and Eastern Steamship Company that were part of Consolidated Steamship Company were not sold to Agwilines Inc. In 1934 Mallory Line merged with Clyde Line to be the Clyde-Mallory Line. In 1949 the Clyde-Mallory Line was sold to the Bull Line, the line was ended by Bull Line. C. H. Mallory served one term in the Connecticut Senate in 1862.  C. H. Mallory father was Patriarch Charles Mallory (1796–1882), he had a fishing fleet in Mystic, Connecticut. The Mallory family had a shipyard in Mystic, that built ships for the Union Navy during the Civil War. Henry H. Raymond was president and general manager of the Clyde Steamship and Mallory Steamship Companies from 1908 to 1923. Clyde-Mallory Lines main ports were: Jacksonville, New York, Miami, Boston, Wilmington, Charleston, Key West, Galveston, Tampa, New Orleans and Mobile.

Clyde Line

Clyde line ran from 1844 to 1907 under the Clyde Steamship Company. Thomas Clyde started the company in New York in 1872. The line ran between the US northeast and southeast. Later added were routes to the Dominican Republic and other West Indies. In 1908 the Clyde line ran under the Atlantic, Gulf and West Indies (AGWI) SS Company. In 1932 Mallory Line merged with Clyde Line. Thomas Clyde (1812–1885) was the founder and owner of the Clyde Line, Clyde Steamship Company. Main ports were New York City, Florida, Florida Keys, Boston, Providence, Cuba, and New Orleans. In 1861 Clyde's son, William P. Clyde took ownership till the 1906 sale. Clyde line ended in 1932, in the merger with Clyde-Mallory Line that ran from 1932 to 1949. Clyde Santo Domingo Line was a subsidiary of Clyde Line with service from New York City to West Indies.

Porto Rico Line
Porto Rico Line of the New York and Porto Rico Steamship Company was founded in 1895 in a partnership with Archibald H. Bull and Juan Ceballos. Bull later founded the A. H. Bull and Company. The Porto Rico Line ran from New York to Red Hook's Atlantic Basin's Pier 35 to Puerto Rico. The Porto Rico Line was a cargo and tourists line, also Puerto Ricans migrated to New York's Red Hook, Brooklyn.

Ward Line

Ward Line was started by the New York and Cuba Mail Steamship Company founded in 1877. Ward Line's first route was service to and from New York, Nassau and Havana. Ward purchased the Alexandre Line in 1888 adding service to the east coast of Mexico. In 1907 Charles W. Morse purchased the Ward Line. In 1908 Morse company went bankrupt and the Ward Line combined with several other Morse companies to form the Atlantic, Gulf and West Indies Line, Agwiline, each division ran under independent management.  In 1908 was owned by Agwilines Inc, in 1954 became Ward-García Line.

Consolidated Steamship Company
Consolidated Steamship was founded by Charles W. Morse. On January 1, 1907 Charles W. Morse joined the Mallory Line, Porto Rico Line, the Ward Line, the Metropolitan Steamship Company and Eastern Steamship Company to form the Consolidated Steamship Lines. The financial crisis panic of 1907 put Consolidated Steamship Company into bankruptcy in 1908. Out of the bankruptcy the Consolidated Steamship Company was sold to the Atlantic, Gulf and West Indies SS Company (AGWI Inc.). The Metropolitan Steamship Company and Eastern Steamship Company that were part of Consolidated Steamship Company were not sold to Agwilines Inc.

World War II
During World War II Agwilines Inc. was active with charter shipping with the Maritime Commission and War Shipping Administration. During wartime, the Agwilines Inc operated Victory ships and Liberty ships. The ship was run by its crew and the US Navy supplied United States Navy Armed Guards to man the deck guns and radio. The most common armament mounted on these merchant ships were the MK II 20mm Oerlikon autocannon and the 3"/50, 4"/50, and 5"/38 deck guns.

Atlantic, Gulf & West Indies Steamship Inc ships

Atlantic, Gulf & West Indies Steamship Inc ships:
Satilla (1912), sunk in 1917 by a U-boat as SS Hans Kinck.
Agwimoon (1920), sank as Altair in 1943 :  
Agwihavre (1921), sank as Gulfpenn in 1942  
Manata (1916), sank as Trym in 1837 
Ozama (1919), sank in 1928 
Panuco (1917), sank in fire at dock in 1941 
Choctaw (1917),  sank as Syoka Maru in 1945  
Agwipond period (1921), sank in 1930 as SS Cities Service Boston    
Agwibay (1921), sank as SS William F. Humphrey in 1942  
Agwisea (1920), sank in 1933

Clyde Line ships

Clyde Line ships:		
Apache
Mohawk (1908)
Lenape (1912)
Huron (1896)
Comanche
Arapahoe
Cherokee (1925), sunk by U-boat June 16, 1942
Chippewa (1905), (freight only)
Philadelphia (1916)

Clyde Santo Domingo Line ships
Passenger and cargo from New York City to Monte Cristi, Puerto Plata, Samana, Sanchez, La Romana, Macoris, Santo Domingo City Azua and Barahona.
Clyde Santo Domingo Line ships:
Algonquin (1926)
Iroquois

Mallory Line ships

Mallory Line ships:				
Comal				
San Jacinto (1903)
Concho (1903)				
Sabine				
Lampasas
Alamo
Medina (1914)
Nueces (1887)
West Cawthon (1919), manager
City of Houston (1871)
Barges: Chas. E. Goin, C. F. Deering, P. C. Golder, Samuel Walker, O. M. Hitchcock (1881)
Annie M. Smull (1868), sank in 1906

Porto Rico Line ships

Porto Rico Line ships:
Coamo (1925), sunk by U-boat in 1942 
Brazos (1889), sunk by U-boat 1941	
Carolina, sunk by U-boat 1918 		
San Juan (1900)
San Lorenzo
Porto Rico
Ponce
Borinquen (1930), sank in 1970
San Jacinto
Mariana (1915), sunk by U-boat in 1942

Ward Line ship
	
Passenger steamships of the Ward Line:

  (1869) sank in 1870 
  (1877)
  (1877)
  (1877)
  (1879)
  (1879)
  (1879)
  (1880)
  (1883)
  (1884)
  (1889)
  (1889)
  (1889)
  (1890)
  (1890)
  (1897) – Chartered from the Red D Line.
 SS Havana (1898)
  (1898)
  (1900)
  (1901)
  (1901)
  (1903)
  (1906)
  (1906)
  (1906)
  (1907)
  (1917)
  (1918)
  (1930)
  (1930)
  (1933)
  (1933)
  (1941)

Clyde-Mallory Line ships
Clyde-Mallory Line ships:

Ship and  year built
Agwistar 1919
Alamo (1) 1883
Alamo (2)	1919
Ansonia 1919
Brazos (1) 1899
Brazos (2) 1907
Carondelet 1873
Carib 1882, sank in 1915   
City of Dallas	1872
City of Galveston 1870, sank in 1876  
City of San Antonio	1872
City of Waco	1873
Colorado (1)	1879
Colorado (2)	1920
Comal	1885
Concho	1891
Denver 1901
Edward S. Atwood 1911 (tug)
Glendaruel	1917
Guadalupe	1881
Henry R. Mallory	1916
Lake Ellithorpe 1919, sank as Empire Kestrel 
Lampasas	1883
Kiowa 1903, sank in 1903 
Leona	1889
Malabar	1914
Malacca	1919
Malamton	1918
Malang	1920
Malantic	1918 (M.J. Scanlon) sank in 1943 by Uboat 
Malay	 
Malchace	1920
Mallard	1917
Mallemak	1919
Malsah	1920
Malton	1923
Maltran	1920
Medina	1914
Minotaur 1918, sunk in 1943 by U-boat 
SS Mohawk (1925)
Mohican (1904), sank 1925  
Neches (1)	1914
Neches (2)	1919, sank 1930 
Norfolk (1916) 
Nueces	1887
Ormidale	1917
Oneida (1919), sank in 1943 in storm 
Osceola	1920
Onondaga 1905, sank in 1918   
Pecos	1899
Rio Grande	1876
Sabine	 
San Jacinto	1903
San Marcos	1881
San Saba 1879, sank as Magnolia in 1918  
Shawnee	 1927 
State of Texas	1873
Swiftarrow	1921
Swifteagle	1921, sank in 1934 
Swiftlight	1921
Swiftscout	1921, sunk in 1945 by U-boat 
Swiftstar	1921, sank in 1923  
Swiftsure	1921
Swiftwind	1921
Western Texas	1877
Victor 1864, sank in 1872 

World War II ships

World War II chartered ships operated by Agwilines Inc.:Anne Bradstreeet 	Beatrice Victory Berwyn Victory 
Coastal Archer
Bucknell Victory
Durham Victory  
DorchesterEthiopia Victory Elwin F. Knowles Fisk Victory     
Frontenac Victory  
George WytheJames Guthrie  
James Iredell, sank after attack in 1943wrecksite James IredelJames Rolph  Jeremiah Van Rensselaer, sunk in 1943 by U-boat wrecksite, Jeremiah Van RensselaerJohn Harvey Jonas Lie Joseph K. Toole 
Joseph Stanton
Joseph R. Lamar
H. H. Raymond
C. Francis Jenkins    
St. Lawrence Victory     Louis Pasteur       
Lake Elsmere
Marine FiddlerMorris Hillquit 
Luther MartinMontclair Victory  
Oliver Ellsworth  
Richard Montgomery      
Robert Treat Paine
Elihu Root
Raymond V. Ingersoll
Robert Trimble 	 
Robert Y. HayneSamuel W. Williston  Theodore Parker  
Trakai
Thomas Sim LeeThomas Hill''

References 

Defunct shipping companies of the United States
Transport companies established in 1908
Transport companies disestablished in 1908
American companies established in 1908
1908 establishments in New York (state)
1956 disestablishments in New York (state)